23rd Renfrewshire Rifle Volunteers (RV) was a 19th-century football club based in New Cathcart, in Glasgow, which participated in the early  seasons of the Scottish Cup.

History

The club's first match was in April 1874, against the Eastern F.C. second XI.  The 23rd R.R.V. met the Eastern's first XI in its first Scottish Cup entry five months later, losing 3–0.

The club reached the second round of the Cup three times.  The first time, in 1875–76, was due to the rule at the time that teams advanced after two draws, and the Volunteers held Sandyford F.C. twice.  In the next two seasons, the club won its first round fixtures, beating Thornliebank F.C. in 1876–77 (2–0 in a replay at Cowglen, after a 1–1 draw at home) and Levern F.C. in 1877–78.  

However, on every occasion, the club lost its third round tie, every time by 1–0; in 1876–77, the club protested the single goal scored by Busby F.C., to no avail. The club's Cup matches were almost all low-scoring affairs, only 12 goals being scored in 10 games.

The club scratched from its final entry in 1879–80 and there are no further matches recorded for the club.

Colours

The club played in dark blue jerseys and knickerbockers, and red socks.

Ground

The club played at Muirend Park in Cathcart.

External links
Scottish Football Club Directory (Archived 2009-10-22)
Scottish Cup results

References

Defunct football clubs in Scotland
Football clubs in Glasgow
Association football clubs established in 1873
Association football clubs disestablished in 1879
1873 establishments in Scotland
1879 disestablishments in Scotland
Military football clubs in Scotland